Ice hockey, simply referred to as hockey in both English and French in Canada, dates back to the 19th century. The sport is very popular and played year-round and at every level in the country. Born of various influences from stick-and-ball games brought from the United Kingdom and indigenous games, the contemporary sport of ice hockey originated in Montreal. It is the official national winter sport of Canada and is widely considered Canada's national pastime, with high levels of participation by children, men and women at various levels of competition.

History
The game of ice hockey has its roots in the various stick-and-ball games played over the centuries in the United Kingdom, and North America. From prior to the establishment of Canada, Europeans are recorded as having played versions of field hockey and its relatives, while the Mi'kmaq indigenous peoples of the Maritimes also had a ball-and-stick game, and made many hockey sticks used by Europeans in the 1800s. Similarly, ice skating team games which eventually became the organized sport of bandy were also played. From these roots, the contemporary sport of ice hockey was developed in Canada, most notably in Montreal, where the first indoor hockey game was played on March 3, 1875, at the Victoria Skating Rink, organized by James Creighton, a McGill University student from Halifax, Nova Scotia. Some characteristics of that game, such as the length of the ice rink and the use of a puck, have been retained. The International Ice Hockey Federation (IIHF) later adopted the Canadian rules as the official rules of ice hockey. 

Annual championships began in Montreal in the 1880s, leading to the awarding of the Stanley Cup, considered the oldest trophy in North American sports. Lord Stanley of Preston was appointed by Queen Victoria to be the Governor General of Canada on June 11, 1888.  While governor, ice hockey was still just forming in Canada.  He first got to see the game of hockey played at Montreal's 1889 Winter Carnival.  During the carnival he watched the Montreal Victorias play the Montreal Hockey Club. Afterwards, Stanley and his family became very involved in the game of ice hockey.  His two sons, Arthur and Algernon, convinced their father to donate a trophy that would be considered to be a visible sign of the ice hockey championship, which was a silver bowl inlaid with gold. The trophy was first presented in 1893 and was called the Dominion Hockey Challenge Cup. The name of the trophy has since been known as the Stanley Cup. Several traditions remain from early amateur play, including hand-shakes between opposing teams after a championship match.

Professionalism began in the 1890s, with players being paid under the table in various sports, including ice hockey and lacrosse. Openly professional leagues emerged after 1900. Five cities in the United States and Ontario formed the International Professional Hockey League (IPHL) in 1904. The American-based league was the beginning of professional ice hockey. The IPHL attracted high-end Canadian players, depriving Canada of its best players. Other early professional play took place in Northern Ontario (the Timiskaming League) and in the Maritimes (the Coloured Hockey League). Although many Canadian amateur teams paid their players under the table, most Canadian hockey associations still stuck to the codes of amateurism. The IPHL ceased after three years, but that was long enough to spark the creation of a Canadian-based professional league, the Ontario Professional Hockey League, in 1908. Though some believe the IHL's short existence was due to lack of spectator interest, the primary reason the league failed was a loss of good players back to Canadian teams that by 1906 played in hockey associations, such as the Eastern Canada Amateur Hockey Association, that allowed professionals to play alongside amateurs. The National Hockey Association was formed in 1910, leading to the National Hockey League in 1917.

The violence of the sport instigated the Ottawa Silver Seven and Montreal Wanderers rivalry of 1907. Newspapers described hockey as a combination of "brutal butchery" and "strenuous spectacle," speaking to public perceptions and different ways of experiencing the game. Ideals of respectable, middle-class masculinity and rough, working-class masculinity co-existed within accounts of fast, skilled, rugged, hard-hitting hockey.

During the 1920s the Winnipeg's senior hockey league for the 1919-20 season, the Winnipeg Falcons, featuring the Icelandic Canadians, became Canadian national champions and won the 1920 Olympic gold medal in Antwerp for Canada in hockey. With their devotion to Canada  in World War I, their integration made this team a symbol of Canadian masculinity, unaffected by the ethnic stereotyping and discrimination that affected some other sports teams during the 1920s.

During the Great Depression, the Canadian Amateur Hockey Association was forced to re-evaluate its position on amateurism in ice hockey and to assess its relationship to the amateur sports infrastructure in Canada, which was headed by the Amateur Athletic Union of Canada. The lacklustre performance of the Canadian national hockey team at the 1936 Olympics,  over player availability forced radical changes on approaches to how the game was formulated in the country.

The Canadian national men's ice hockey team dominated international amateur play from the 1920s until the early 1950s, when the introduction of state-sponsored national ice hockey programs, notably from the Soviet Union, began to dominate over the club-based Canadian program. Canada would change to a national team composed of amateurs and eventually withdraw from international senior-level competition in a dispute over the introduction of professionals, considered Canada's best, to counter the dominance and provide an "even playing field" in the eyes of Canadian ice hockey officials.

In September 1972, Canada's best hockey players from the National Hockey League (NHL) played the elite amateurs from the Soviet Union in a friendly series. When Canadian prime minister Pierre Trudeau met his Soviet counterpart, Alexei Kosygin, in 1971, their discussions included increasing the hockey competitions between the two countries. Soon after, hockey hierarchies of both nations decided on a series of eight games, four to be played across Canada and four in Moscow. For Canadians, the Summit Series was intended to be a celebration of their global supremacy in ice hockey. The architects of Soviet hockey, on the other hand, had designs on surprising Canada and the world with their skill and claiming the Canadian game as their own. 

The Summit Series was the catalyst for a re-examination of the Canadian hockey system, organization, coaching and training methods. The changes in Canadian ice hockey, along with the acceptance of professional players in international play, would eventually lead to a return to international competition in the 1990s, and an Olympic gold medal in 2002, Canada's first in fifty years. The 1990s also saw the introduction of international championships in women's ice hockey, with a Canadian national women's team formed, leading to Olympic participation, and the development of professional women's hockey.

The Hockey Hall of Fame, located in Toronto, Ontario, is the permanent home of many ice hockey trophies, including the Stanley Cup. The Hall also honours the greatest ice hockey players, inducting players annually. Some of the great Canadian hockey players honoured in the Hall include Wayne Gretzky of Ontario, who holds many NHL scoring records; Maurice Richard of Montreal, a hero in Quebec, who led the Montreal Canadiens to eight Stanley Cups; Gordie Howe of Saskatchewan, and Bobby Orr of Ontario, among many others.

National and international competitions

Prominent trophies for national championships in Canada are the Memorial Cup for the top junior-age men's team and the Allan Cup for the top men's senior team. There are national championships in several other divisions of play. Hockey Canada is the sport's official governing body in Canada and is a member of the International Ice Hockey Federation (IIHF). A Canadian national men's team, composed of professionals, competes in the annual IIHF Men's World Championship and in the Olympics. Russia and U.S.A are considered the Canada national team major rival.

Participation rates
Ice hockey is one of the most played sports in the country at the youth level and remains popular for adults whether in organized professional, amateur or recreational leagues. Numerous tournaments are held annually, and ice hockey games are often part of winter carnivals, and many outdoor ice rinks are constructed for the winter season. In 2010, an estimated 1.3 million Canadian adults participated in ice hockey, second to golf.

The sport is the third-most popular sport among Canadian children. A 2010 survey estimated that 22% of households have a child playing ice hockey, while 25% of households have a child playing soccer, and 24% of households have a child participating in swimming. The sport faces increasing competition from other popular sports such as basketball, soccer,
 and field hockey, which all have high participation rates. Another factor facing participation rates is the relative higher cost of hockey equipment. In 2013, the average cost of ice hockey equipment for youth was estimated at  while basketball equipment cost $310 and soccer equipment cost $160.

Women's ice hockey

Women's hockey in Canada is growing. The top-level Canadian Women's Hockey League ran for 12 seasons from 2007-19.  The Clarkson Cup is the highest trophy in Canadian women's hockey. Women's hockey teams exist at some college and university institutions, while girls' teams exist where numbers support organizing teams and girls often participate in co-ed youth leagues. From the 2001–02 season to the 2012–13 season, female Hockey Canada registrations increased by 59%.

National identity
Ice hockey is so popular in Canada that is considered a major component of Canadian culture and national identity.

Canada's national game debate
In May 1964, former Canadian Amateur Hockey Association president and then current member of parliament Jack Roxburgh did extensive research to find if Canadian parliament had ever declared a national game, and specifically looked into whether lacrosse was officially declared. After going through parliamentary records, he found no law was ever enacted. The Canadian Press reported at the time that the myth of lacrosse as Canada's national game possibly came from a book published in 1869 titled Lacrosse, the National Game of Canada, and that the Canadian Lacrosse Association was founded in 1867. His endeavour to declare hockey as Canada's national game coincided with the Great Canadian Flag Debate of 1964. On October 28, 1964, Roxburgh moved to introduce Bill C–132, with respect to declaring hockey as the national game of Canada.

Canadian Lacrosse Association members responded to the motion by calling it insulting and "out of line", and vowed to fight it. On June 11, 1965, Bob Prittie replied by introducing a separate bill to have lacrosse declared as Canada's national game and stated that, "I think it is fitting at this time when we are considering national flags, national anthems and other national symbols, that this particular matter should be settled now". The choice of Canada's national game was debated in 1965, but neither bill was passed when parliament was dissolved. In 1967, Prime Minister Lester B. Pearson proposed to name national summer and winter games, but nothing was resolved. Finally in April 1994, Bill C–212 was passed to recognize hockey as Canada's official winter game, and lacrosse as its summer game.

See also
Canada men's national ice hockey team
Canada national women's ice hockey team
History of Canadian sports
History of the National Hockey League
Ice hockey in Calgary
Ice hockey in Ottawa

References

Bibliography
Boyd, Bill. All Roads Lead to Hockey: Reports from Northern Canada to the Mexican Border. (2006). 240 pp
Dryden, Ken. "Soul on Ice: A Century of Canadian Hockey." Beaver (Dec 2000/Jan 2001), Vol. 80, Issue 6 in EBSCO
Dryden, Ken, and Roy MacGregor. Home Game: Hockey and Life in Canada (1989)
Gruneau, Richard. Hockey night in Canada: Sport, identities and cultural politics, (1993)
Hollan, Andrew C., 'Playing in the Neutral Zone: Meanings and uses of ice hockey in the Canada-U.S. Borderlands, 1895-1915', American Review Of Canadian Studies, 2004, 34(1).
Hughes-Fuller, Helen Patricia. "The Good Old Game: Hockey, Nostalgia, Identity." PhD dissertation U. of Alberta 2002. 258 pp. DAI 2004 64(7): 2496-A. 
Melançon, Benoît. The Rocket: A Cultural History of Maurice Richard (2009), outstanding interpretation, emphasizing how Canadians understood their great hero. 
Moore, Mark. Saving the Game: Pro Hockey's Quest to Raise its Game from Crisis to New Heights. (2nd ed. 2006). 420 pp.
Morrow, Don, and Kevin Wamsley. Sport in Canada: A History. (2005). 318 pp. ISBN 978-0-19- 541996-2. online review
Stubbs, Dave, and Neal Portnoy. Our Game: The History of Hockey in Canada'' (2006) 
Wong, John Chi-Kit. "The Development of Professional Hockey and the Making of the National Hockey League." PhD dissertation U. of Maryland, College Park 2001. 432 pp. DAI 2002 62(9): 3152-A. DA3024988 Fulltext: ProQuest Dissertations & Theses

 
Ice hockey
Canada